The Saltisford Canal Arm is a short stretch of canal located in the town of Warwick, Warwickshire, England. Opened in the 1790s, originally it wasn't an arm at all, but the start of the Warwick / Birmingham Canal. It took on the appearance of an (arm) branch when the Warwick / Napton canal, which junctions at the Birmingham Road / Budbrooke Industrial Estate, was completed. It is the last surviving branch (arm) of the much longer, nationally known Grand Union Canal.
The arm was first opened in 1799 as a terminus for the Warwick and Birmingham Canal. Its initial purpose was purely to allow goods to be transported near to the town centre with its castle and market. However, the building of the gas works next to the end of the arm in 1822 also greatly increased its usage. 

It stayed under the control of the W&B canal, through various mergers, until 1927, when it was purchased by the Regent's Canal company which, two years later, was renamed the Grand Union. 
The 1930s saw the site used extensively as a workyard and storage area during the construction of the nearby Hatton Locks. The Transport Act 1947 saw the canal network as a whole nationalised and British Waterways was formed after the Transport Act 1962 which split control of the canals and railways between two different authorities. At this time, the arm, after leaving the main canal, passed under the Chiltern Main Line railway bridge and terminated at the back of what is now The Antelope Pub next to Sainsbury's, making it around 750 metres long. During the 1970s however, with the decline of the gasworks, the downsizing of the town market and the opening of the A46 bypass, usage of the arm decreased and it eventually fell into disuse.

It was during this period that part of the arm was taken out of use and filled in. This led to the canal terminating just before the Chiltern Main Line, cutting its length to approximately 440 metres. The former canal bed is virtually untraceable, having been built over with houses and offices. All that remains is a well hidden bridge next to a car park. This led, in 1982, to the formation of the Saltisford Canal Trust which spent the next six years restoring the remainder of the route to its former glories. Further work was done in 2007, helped by a £2,000 grant from the Inland Waterways Association. The arm now houses several permanent boats, on which families live, as well as playing host to many travelling vessels and hiring out two boats for public use.

See also
Grand Union Canal
Warwick

References

Canals in England
Canals in Warwickshire
Buildings and structures in Warwick